Little Hope is an unincorporated community in the town of Dayton, in Waupaca County, Wisconsin, United States.

Notes

Unincorporated communities in Waupaca County, Wisconsin
Unincorporated communities in Wisconsin